The 2012 season was Cruzeiro's 42nd consecutive season in the top flight of Brazilian football, playing in every edition of the Campeonato Brasileiro's first division. The team finished in 9th the league, reached the Round of 16 of the Copa do Brasil and the semifinals of the Campeonato Mineiro.

Team kits
The team kits for the 2012 season are produced by Olympikus and sponsored by Banco BMG and Guaramix.

Squads

First-team squad

Club
<div style="float:left; width:47%;">

Coaching staff

References

External links
 

Cruzeiro Esporte Clube seasons
Cruzeiro Esporte Clube season